The St. Paul Slam! was a professional basketball club based in Saint Paul, Minnesota, United States, that competed in the International Basketball Association beginning in the 1996-97 season. After just two seasons the team folded.

Season results

References

External links
  St. Paul Slam on USbasket

Basketball teams in Minnesota
Defunct basketball teams in the United States
Sports in Saint Paul, Minnesota
1996 establishments in Minnesota
1998 disestablishments in Minnesota
Basketball teams established in 1996
Basketball teams disestablished in 1998